It was a Dacian fortified town.

References

Dacian fortresses in Bistrița-Năsăud County
Historic monuments in Bistrița-Năsăud County
Ancient history of Transylvania